Ruy Roque Gameiro (27 February 1906 – 18 August 1935) was a Portuguese sculptor. Although he died relatively young, he won the admiration of critics, particularly José de Figueiredo.

Background
Son of the watercolour master Alfredo Roque Gameiro and disciple of José Simões de Almeida (nephew), he attended the auto mechanic course at the Marqués de Pombal Industrial School in Lisbon, at that time directed by Sanches de Castro.

In 1928, he finished the course of the School of Fine Arts of Lisbon, with a proven proof of sculpture under the title Abel and Cain. The following year, he exhibited for the first time in the National Society of Fine Arts – Sociedade Nacional de Belas Artes, with two sculptures, Salomé and the head of the painter José Tagarro, the latter soon acquired for the National Museum of Contemporary Art.

In 1930, he won the contest for the monument to the dead from the First World War in Abrantes, Portugal, the first to be modelled in concrete. 

In collaboration with architect Veloso Reis, in 1931 he was awarded first prize by the jury for the selection of a monument to the dead of the First World War for Lourenço Marques (today Maputo), a sculpture that was delivered to the city in 1935.

The sculptor won a contest for the realization of a statue of Don Juan II of Portugal, which was erected on Avenida da India, in Lisbon. He also participated in the Salon des Independants, organized in SNBA.

He married María Elena Castelo Branco in 1933; and, in the same year, he modelled statues and bas-reliefs for the design of the monument to Henry the Navigator, to be erected in Sagres, designed by the architects Carlos e Guilherme Rebelo de Andrade. 

He died at the age of 29 in a car accident on the Sintra Road between his motorcycle and a car.

References

1906 births
1935 deaths
20th-century Portuguese sculptors
Male sculptors
20th-century male artists